She's My Weakness is a 1930 American Pre-Code romantic comedy film directed by Melville W. Brown (assisted by Dewey Starkey) and starring Sue Carol and Arthur Lake. The screenplay was written by J. Walter Ruben, based on the Broadway play Tommy by Howard Lindsay and Bertrand Robinson.

Plot
Tommy Mills wants to marry his girlfriend, Marie Thurber, but cannot afford it.  When he inherits a piece of property, he plans on selling it in order to facilitate the marriage.  However, Marie is also being pursued by Bernard Norton, who is not as seemingly dull as Tommy.  Marie's parents would prefer their daughter to marry Tommy, but things get complicated when Marie's father, Warren, needs to sell a piece of property he owns in order to get himself out of financial difficulty.  The town is interested in both pieces, but will only purchase one of them.

To further complicate matters, Tommy's uncle, David Tuttle is attempting to broker the deal for the purchase of the land.  In the confusion which ensues, both land parcels are sold without the permission of their owners.  The resulting chaos gives the appearance of misdeeds by Tommy, which pushes Marie towards the arms of her other suitor. However, the truth comes out in the end, both Tommy and Mr. Thurber sell their properties and alleviate their financial needs, and Tommy and Marie get married.

Cast

 Arthur Lake as Tommy Mills
 Sue Carol as Marie Thurber
 Lucien Littlefield as Warren Thurber
 William Collier Sr. as David Tuttle
 Helen Ware as Mrs. Thurber
 Alan Bunce as Bernard Norton
 Emily Fitzroy as Mrs. Oberlander

(cast list as per AFI database)

Reception
The New York Times, in its review of the film, gave it mostly lukewarm and negative reviews. The critic commented negatively on the performances of the two leads, going so far to characterize Lake's performance by stating his "... adolescent appearance makes him ideal for the part but whose apparent ignorance of what is good acting is appalling." while calling the acting of some of the supporting cast adequate, and was also less than thrilled with the direction of the piece

Notes
The Broadway play on which this film was based, Tommy, was directed by the playwrights, and ran from January through August 1927 at the Gaiety Theatre.  It was revived for a short run in August 1933 at the Forrest Theatre, which is now known as the Eugene O'Neill Theatre. The tagline for the film was "Youth whoops it up in the rumble seat!"

References

External links

American romantic comedy films
1930 romantic comedy films
American films based on plays
American black-and-white films
RKO Pictures films
Films directed by Melville W. Brown
1930 films
1930s American films